Thomas Ward Bleick (born March 21, 1943 - April 9, 2022) was an American football defensive back in the National Football League (NFL). He played for the Baltimore Colts and the Atlanta Falcons. He played collegiately for the Georgia Tech. Died April 9, 2022

References

1943 births
2022 deaths
People from Talladega, Alabama
Players of American football from Alabama
American football defensive backs
Georgia Tech Yellow Jackets football players
Baltimore Colts players
Atlanta Falcons players